HMS Caroline was a  composite screw sloop of the Royal Navy, built at Sheerness Dockyard, fitted with Maudslay, Sons and Field machinery and launched on 25 November 1882. She was later reclassified as a corvette.

Service history

On arrival she was reduced to dockyard reserve.

Caroline was hulked in 1897 and served at Harwich as the hospital ship to the boys' training ship HMS Ganges at Harwich. Once shore hospital facilities had been built in 1902, Caroline was refitted as overflow accommodation for 60 boys. In 1904 both hulks left Harwich for Shotley, Suffolk, and as the school expanded ashore, a series of old ships inherited the name Ganges, with Caroline receiving the name in April 1908. In 1913 she was renamed Powerful III and moved to Devonport, where she became part of the training establishment at Devonport. In November 1919 she inherited the name of the training establishment as Impregnable IV. She was sold on 31 August 1929.

Citations

References

 

1882 ships
Ships built in Sheerness
Satellite-class sloops
Victorian-era sloops of the United Kingdom